Meliana is a municipality in the comarca of Horta Nord in the Valencian Community, Spain. Meliana was home to a mosaic tile factory circa 1860, which gained some recognition for its experimentation on methods that encouraged workers to react productively in response to the high competition in the textile industry. This task continued until the 1880s, until these practices began to be criticised as exploitative and unethical by a regional newspaper.

References 

Municipalities in the Province of Valencia
Horta Nord